This is a list of fellows of the Royal Society elected in 1687.

Fellows 
Jacobus Sylvius  (1647–1689)
Johann Weikhard Valvasor Freiherr von (1641–1693)
Benjamin Middleton  (1668–1712)
Jean de Hautefeuille  (1647–1724)
William Wotton  (1666–1727)

References

1687
1687 in science
1687 in England